Queen's College, Lagos, is a government-owned girl's secondary (high) school with boarding facilities, situated in Yaba, Lagos, Nigeria. Often referred to as the "sister college" of King's College, Lagos, it was founded on October 10, 1927, when Nigeria was still a British colony.

Nigeria has a 6-3-3-4 system of education. Queen's College takes the secondary pupils in the middle two phases. There are six year groups, or grades; each year group contains about 600 students divided into several arms. Recently, class sizes have reduced to an average of 40 per class. The total population for the 2006/2007 session was 2,160 students.

The school has returned the best results nationwide in the West African Senior School Certificate Examination (WASSCE) conducted by the West African Examinations Council (WAEC) seven times since 1985 and is widely considered to be one of the top schools in Nigeria, and one of the top girls' schools on the African continent. The Queen's College motto is "Pass On The Torch". Bringing out the best in girls and girl child education, the school vision is to "produce generations of women who will excel, compete globally and contribute meaningfully to nation building".

History
Queen's College was established on October 10, 1927, with an enrolment of 20 students, a Principal and eight part-time teachers. Sylvia Leith-Ross was appointed "Lady Superintendent of Education" in 1925 and she helped to establish Queen's College as a girl's boarding school.

Queen's College has grown to a population 3000 students, and a staff strength of well over 300 full-time teachers.

Queen's College has provided education for girls in Nigeria - creating equal gender opportunities for them in professional fields. Girls are given the opportunity to pursue courses in the Sciences, Medicine, Engineering, Law, Architecture, the Arts, etc.

Structure
The school operates at two levels: junior and senior school. The lowest forms, JS I to JS III, make up the junior school. Students in those forms study for the Junior School Certificate Examination conducted by the National Examination Council (NECO) and taken at the end of their third year. The Senior School Examination is the goal of the students in the upper forms.
 
Two examination bodies – West African Examinations Council and National Examinations Council – are each empowered to conduct separately the end-of-course examination and students are to enter for both examinations.
 
The senior and junior schools are distinct in their operations. Each stream of JS 1 through SS 3 has about eleven classrooms with varying numbers of students.

For management of both sections, the school is headed by the principal, designated PQC (Principal Queen's College) who is assisted by four vice principals:
 The Vice Principal Administration 
 The Vice Principal Special Duties
 The Vice Principal Academics
 The Vice Principal Student Affairs

Curriculum
The curriculum of the school covers Science, Social Science, Arts -and vocational subjects as well as co-curricular activities. In line with the 6-3-3 4 system of education, the scope has been enlarged to give a broad-based education with subjects that can lead to courses in tertiary institutions. Staff and twelve Guidance Counselors are available to assist students in learning, in their choice of career, social adjustment, as well as their welfare.

Subjects offered in both Junior and Senior schools are:                
 English Language, Literature-in-English, History
 Mathematics, Further mathematics
 Social Studies, Geography
 Integrated Science (Biology, Chemistry and Physics)
 French Language
 Business Studies, Economics, Commerce, Accounting
 Introductory Technology
 Christian Religious Studies/Islamic Religious Studies
 Nigerian language - Yoruba/Hausa/Igbo Languages
 Agric/PHE
 Arabic
 Music/Fine art
 Home Economics
 Typewriting
 Computer Studies
 Government
 Trading
 Insurance/Book -keeping
 Home economics/Food And Nutrition/Clothing And Textile.

The girls are involved in games and sports. The annual inter-house sports competition is usually held during the second term of the academic session.
The school has six houses that compete in the inter-house games, namely Dan-Fodio (Red House), Obasa (Blue House), Obi (Yellow House), Emotan (Green House), Efunjoke (Purple House) and Obong (Orange House).

Principals
  Miss F. Wordsworth (later Mrs. Tolfree) - 1927 to 1930
  Miss W. W. Blackwell - 1931 to 1942
 Mrs. D. Mather - 1942 to 1944
  Dr. Alice Whittaker - 1944 to 1946
  Miss Ethel Hobson - 1946 to 1950
  Miss Mary Hutcheson -1950 to 1954
  Miss Joyce Moxon - 1954 to 1955
  Miss Margaret. Gentle (later Mrs. Harwood) - 1956 to 1963
  Mrs. I. E. Coker - 1963 to 1977 (First Nigerian principal of Queen's college)
  Mrs. T. E. Chukwuma - 1978 to 1982
  Mrs.A.A Kafaru - 1982 to 1986.
  Mrs. J. E. Ejueyitche - 1986 to 1987
  Mrs. J. Namme - 1987 to 1991
  Mrs. H. E. G. Marinho - 1991 to 1996
  Mrs. M. T.F. Sojinrin - 1996 to 2001
  Mrs. O. O. Euler-Ajayi - 2001 to 2004
  Mrs. M. B. Abolade - 2004 to 2006
  Mrs. O. Togonu-Bickersteth - 2006 to 2008
  Mrs. A. C. Onimole - 2008 to 2010
  Mrs. A.  Ogunnaike - 2010 to 2011
  Mrs. M. O. A. Ladipo - 2011 - 2012
  Mrs E. M. Osime - 2012 - 2015
  Dr Mrs Lami Amodu - 2015 - 2017
  Mrs B. A. Are  - 2017 - 2018
  Dr Mrs Oyinloye Yakubu - 2018 till date

Notable alumni
Suzanne Iroche, CEO of FinBank
Claire Ighodaro, née Ukpoma, management accountant 
Phebean Ogundipe née Itayemi, author, educator and the first Nigerian woman to be published in English
Modupe Omo-Eboh, first female judge in Nigeria
Sefi Atta, award-winning writer
Lara George, award-winning Gospel artiste
Honey Ogundeyi, founder of Fashpa
Grace Alele-Williams, first female vice chancellor of a Nigerian university
Prof. Folashade Ogunsola, medical microbiologist
Adaku Ufere, international lawyer and energy expert
Uche Chika Elumelu, actor
Gbemi Olateru Olagbegi, media personality
Late Tosyn Bucknor, media personality
Toni Tones, actress

See also 
Oyinkansola Abayomi
Kofoworola Ademola
Federal Government College Ikot Ekpene
Federal Government Girls College, Benin City

References

External links
Official website

Secondary schools in Lagos State
Girls' schools in Lagos
Boarding schools in Nigeria
Educational institutions established in 1927
1927 establishments in Nigeria
Schools in Lagos
History of women in Lagos
Yaba, Lagos